Mount Holyoke College is a private liberal arts women's college in South Hadley, Massachusetts. It is the oldest member of the historic Seven Sisters colleges, a group of elite historically women's colleges in the Northeastern United States.

The college was founded in 1837 as the Mount Holyoke Female Seminary by Mary Lyon, a pioneer in education for women. A model upon which many other women's colleges were patterned, it is the oldest institution within the Seven Sisters schools, an alliance of East Coast liberal arts colleges that was originally created to provide women with an education equivalent to that provided in the then men-only Ivy League. Mount Holyoke is part of the region's Five College Consortium, along with Amherst College, Smith College, Hampshire College, and the University of Massachusetts Amherst: through this membership, students are allowed to take courses at any other member institution.

Undergraduate admissions are restricted to female, transgender, and nonbinary students. In 2014, it became the first member of the Seven Sisters to introduce an admissions policy that was inclusive to transgender students. However, all graduate programs are open to applicants regardless of gender. Unlike the open curriculums of the other liberal arts schools in the Five College Consortium, Mount Holyoke undergraduates are required to take at least one class each in the humanities, science or mathematics, social sciences, and foreign language, as well as a physical education requirement.

The college's 800-acre (3.2 km2) campus includes the Mount Holyoke College Art Museum, the John Payson Williston Observatory, and a botanic garden, and awards the Glascock Prize annually. Alumni and affiliates include notable poets, authors, feminists, academics, entertainers, scientists, politicians, and civil rights activists, as well as recipients of the Nobel Prize, Pulitzer Prize, Olympic Gold Medal, Rhodes Scholarship, Emmy Award, Golden Globe, and Academy Award.

History 

Mount Holyoke was founded in 1837 by Mary Lyon as Mount Holyoke Female Seminary.  Lyon is considered to have been an innovator in women's education. Lyon was a Congregationalist. Mount Holyoke Female Seminary was one of several Christian institutions of higher education for young women established during the first half of the 19th century. Lyon's contemporaries include Sarah Pierce (Litchfield Female Academy, 1792); Catharine Beecher (Hartford Female Seminary, 1823); Zilpah P. Grant Banister (Ipswich Female Seminary, 1828); and George Washington Doane (St. Mary's Hall, 1837 now called Doane Academy). Prior to founding Mount Holyoke, Lyon contributed to the development of both Hartford Female Seminary and Ipswich Female Seminary. She was also involved in the creation of Wheaton Female Seminary (now Wheaton College) in 1834. Mount Holyoke Female Seminary was chartered as a teaching seminary in 1836 and opened its doors to students on 8 November 1837. Both Vassar College and Wellesley College were patterned after Mount Holyoke.

According to historian Amanda Porterfield, Lyon created Mount Holyoke to be "a religious institution that offered a model of Christian society for all to see." Students "were required to attend church services, chapel talks, prayer meetings, and Bible study groups. Twice a day teachers and students spent time in private devotions. Every dorm room had two large lighted closets to give roommates privacy during their devotions". Mount Holyoke Female Seminary was the sister school to Andover Seminary. Some Andover graduates looked to marry students from the Mount Holyoke Female Seminary before becoming Christian missionaries because the American Board of Commissioners for Foreign Missions (ABCFM) required its missionaries to be married before starting their missions. By 1859 there were more than 60 missionary alumnae; by 1887 the school's alumnae comprised one-fifth of all female American missionaries for the ABCFM; and by the end of the century, 248 of its alumnae had entered the mission field.

Collegiate charter 
Mount Holyoke Female Seminary received its collegiate charter in 1888, becoming Mount Holyoke Seminary and College. The change in admission from Seminary to College included fundraising by the trustees, an overhaul of the entrance requirements, and course catalog. Entrance exams were introduced at this time, scheduled in June or September at the college. In 1889, students traveling from the midwest could take these examinations in Freeport, Illinois, and within a few years, this was expanded to other cities. Many additions were made to the course catalog, and starting in the 1889 academic year, students could choose to pursue degrees of Bachelor of Arts or Bachelor of Science.  Within 4 years, the seminary enrollment dropped from 269 to 8. In 1893, the seminary course was discontinued, and the new title Mount Holyoke College was authorized.

Cottage-style living 
A movement towards what was referred to as cottage-style living started in 1889 by the New York Association after the change to Mount Holyoke Seminary and College. $15,000 was raised, and plans were put in place for Mary Brigham Cottage, with accommodations for the president and thirty students, with priority given to those in the collegiate course. At the time, two South Hadley families agreed to host boarders, and some students were permitted to live at the hotel. President Elizabeth Mead deemed both of these options unsatisfactory and pushed the trustees to build yet another cottage. Mrs. Mead was ready to relieve the students of a large share of the drudgery of domestic work that had made up a good portion of their studies since Mary Lyon's conception of the seminary. From 1895 to 1996 the trustees allotted funds for the employment of four women to wash the dinner dishes that had formerly constituted the task of eight or ten students.

On February 28, 1987, the United States Postal Service's Great Americans series issued a postage stamp featuring Mary Lyon, in honor of Mount Holyoke's Sesquicentennial (Mount Holyoke's 150th anniversary).

Phi Beta Kappa chapter 
The Mount Holyoke chapter of Phi Beta Kappa was established in 1905. It has been a sister school to Women's Christian College in Chennai, Tamil Nadu, India since 1920.

Debate on becoming co-educational 
In the early 1970s, Mount Holyoke had a long debate under the presidency of David Truman over the issue of coeducation. On 6 November 1971, the board of trustees voted to remain a women's college.

Admission of transgender students 
At Convocation on September 2, 2014, President Lynn Pasquerella announced a new policy allowing the admission of transgender individuals of both sexes to the college, as well as the admission of students whose gender identities are non-binary. It was the first Seven Sister College to implement such policy.

Admissions 

The 2020 annual ranking by U.S. News & World Report categorizes Mount Holyoke as "more selective".

For the Class of 2023 (enrolling fall 2019), Mount Holyoke received 3,908 applications, accepted 1,491 (38.2%), and enrolled 496.  The middle 50% range of SAT scores for enrolled students was 1320–1450 for the composite, 630–720 for evidence-based reading and writing, and 640–770 for math, while the middle 50% range for the ACT composite score was 27–32.

For the most recent class of 2025 (enrolling fall 2021) there were 3,971 applications, Mount Holyoke accepted 2,077 (43.8%). The middle range of SAT scores for the class of 2025 in critical reading was 670-750 and 640-760 for math. For the ACT the mean test score was 32. 50% of the accepted class was in the top 10% of their high school class rank and 72% was in the top 20. Regarding demographics, 30% of accepted students were from New England (the highest percentage) with the lowest percentage being 4% from the Southwest. The class of 2025 represents 39 states in total. Lastly, 21% were of international residence with a total of 41 foreign countries being represented. <https://www.mtholyoke.edu/admission/class_profile>

Rankings 

U.S. News & World Reports 2021 rankings ranked Mount Holyoke the 34th-best liberal arts college in the nation, and tied for 30th for "Best Undergraduate Teaching". Kiplinger's Personal Finance places the school 37th in its 2017 ranking of best-value liberal arts colleges in the United States. In 2020, The Princeton Review ranked Mount Holyoke's faculty #1 in the nation, and ranked it #1 in the list of the Top 20 Best Schools for Making an Impact.

Mount Holyoke College is accredited by the New England Commission of Higher Education.

Academics

Undergraduate programs 
Mount Holyoke offers 50 departmental and interdepartmental majors, including the option to design a special major. The most popular undergraduate majors, based on 2021 graduates, were:
Experimental Psychology (45)
Biology/Biological Sciences (44)
Econometrics & Quantitative Econometrics (34)
English Language & Literature (33) 
Computer Science (26)
Neuroscience (21)
International Relations & Affairs (20)

The primary degree conferred is the Bachelor of Arts (BA) degree, for which students complete 128-semester credits (one standard course equals 4 credits). At least 68 credits must be earned from coursework outside the major department, across the three curricular divisions: humanities, science and mathematics, and social sciences. Study of a foreign language and completion of a multicultural perspectives course is also required.

Mount Holyoke's membership in the Five College Consortium allows students to enroll in courses at nearby Amherst College, Smith College, Hampshire College, and the University of Massachusetts Amherst. They may also complete one of 12 Five College Certificates—among them African studies, Buddhist studies, coastal and marine sciences, cognitive neuroscience, international relations, and Middle Eastern studies—in lieu of a minor.

Graduate programs 

In addition to the BA, Mount Holyoke offers three master's degrees: a coed Master of Arts in Teaching, a Master of Arts in mathematics teaching, and a master's in psychology. Other programs include dual-degree programs in engineering with the California Institute of Technology, the Thayer School of Engineering at Dartmouth College, and the University of Massachusetts Amherst; the Frances Perkins Program, for women over the age of 24 who wish to complete the requirements for a Bachelor of Arts degree; and the Postbaccalaureate Studies Program, for students who have already earned an undergraduate degree and wish to complete additional course work in preparation for graduate work in medicine, nursing, veterinary medicine, dentistry, or physical therapy science.

Academic centers and programs 
Three academic centers—the Weissman Center for Leadership, the McCulloch Center for Global Initiatives, the Miller Worley Center for the Environment—support the academic program through public lectures by visiting scholars, conferences on issues of pressing concern, mentoring and internship opportunities, and hands-on learning experiences. The Weissman Center's Speaking, Arguing, and Writing (SAW) Program provides opportunities for developing leadership and communication skills, including the ability to effectively frame, articulate, and advocate positions. The Community-Based Learning Program links students with community-based organizations in courses that combine analysis and action.

Study abroad 
Mount Holyoke has study abroad programs and exchanges for full-year or semester study in France, Senegal, Costa Rica, Chile, Hong Kong, Japan, South Korea, Germany, Spain, and the United Kingdom, as well as a summer program in China and January term programs in Georgia and South Africa. The college is also affiliated with more than 150 study abroad programs in more than 50 colleges and students have the opportunity to petition any programs with which the college is not already affiliated. The college also encourages international internships and research for the semester, year, summer, or January terms. Each year more than 200 Mount Holyoke students, representing approximately 40 percent of the junior class, study for a semester or academic year at universities and programs abroad.

Twelve college exchange program 
Through the school's membership in the Twelve College Exchange Program, Mount Holyoke students can study at one of the following 12 other schools for one semester or a full year:
 Amherst College
 Bowdoin College
 Connecticut College
 Dartmouth College
 O'Neill National Theatre Institute
 Smith College
 Trinity College
 Vassar College
 Wellesley College
 Wesleyan University
 Wheaton College
 Williams/Mystic Seaport Program in Maritime Studies

Library 

Mount Holyoke's library includes more than 740,000 print volumes, 1,600 periodicals, and more than 140,000 electronic resources. Its first librarian was an alumna Mary Nutting. Through the Five College Consortium, students have access to more than 9 million volumes. Computer support is provided. The MEWS (Mediated Educational Work Space) supports collaborative multimedia learning with group project rooms, wall-mounted plasma displays, a digitization center, and a faculty development area. In 2013, "Clear and Gold Tower," a glass sculpture by Dale Chihuly, was installed in the Williston Library's atrium.

Faculty 
A number of faculty are nationally and internationally recognized for their research and writing achievements, including Christopher Benfey (literary scholar), Joseph Ellis (historian), Susan Barry (neurobiologist), Mark McMenamin (geologist and paleontologist) and Becky Wai-Ling Packard (psychologist).

Attempted murder of faculty member 
Mount Holyoke administrator and art professor Rie Hachiyanagi made international headlines when she was charged with the attempted murder of a regular member of the faculty on 23 December 2019. Hachiyanagi allegedly used a fire poker, large rock, and a gardening shears to attempt to beat and kill her victim. Hachiyanagi's alleged victim survived the attack.  Hachiyanagi pled guilty to the charges and on October 20, 2021, was sentenced to a term of 10 to 12 years in prison.

Campus 

 
The  campus was designed and landscaped between 1896 and 1922 by the landscape architecture firm of Olmsted and Sons. The campus includes a botanic garden, two lakes, several waterfalls, tennis courts, stables, and woodland riding trails. It is also home to the Mount Holyoke College Art Museum which is part of the Five College Museums/Historic Deerfield and the Museums10. An independent bookstore, The Odyssey Bookshop, is located directly across from the campus in the college-owned Village Commons. Mount Holyoke has instituted “The Big Turn Off” energy conservation campaign. It also focuses on "green" building with five LEED certified buildings on campus. It has reduced its environmental impact by recycling 40% of waste and composting as well as using produce grown in the student-run organic garden in dining halls.

The Seminary Building (1837) contained classrooms, parlors and rooms for students and faculty, the original library, and a periodical reading room. A south wing was added in 1841, a north wing in 1853, and a gymnasium and laundry in 1865. All were destroyed by fire in 1896. Upon the burning of the college building in September 1896, Treasurer Williston announced the pressing need for a new chapel building, a new gymnasium, and a series of cottage dormitories in the modern style. This style of separated buildings allowed for flexibility in fundraising that was attractive to the trustees, while still providing the students with the resources and accommodations they needed. In 1897, Mary Lyon Hall and Mary Lyon Chapel were built, as well as dormitories Brigham, Safford, Porter, and Pearsons. Blanchard Gymnasium was completed in 1899.

John Payson Williston Observatory (1881) was given in memory of the Willistons' eldest son and built to be ready for the rare transit of Venus in 1882. It is the oldest academic building on campus.

The school's iconic entrance, the Fidelia Nash Field gate, was dedicated in 1912. It was a gift of its namesake's children Helen Field James and Joseph Nash Field. Their brother Marshall Field had died in 1906.

The home of Benjamin Ruggles Woodbridge, known as "The Sycamores", served as a dormitory for the college from 1915 to 1970. The mansion, built in 1788 by Colonel Woodbridge, is on the National Register of Historic Places.

Mount Holyoke is also close to the cities of Amherst and Northampton as well as to two malls: Hampshire Mall and Holyoke Mall. The Mount Holyoke Range State Park is also close to the campus. The college is named after the westernmost mountain of the range Mount Holyoke which was named by colonial surveyors in the 1600s.

Mount Holyoke is consistently named on "Most Beautiful College Campuses" lists, including The Huffington Post, The Princeton Review, and Architectural Digest. Its buildings were designed between 1896 and 1960. It has a Donald Ross-designed 18-hole golf course, The Orchards, which hosted the U.S. Women's Open in 2004.

Dormitories 
The college has 21 residence halls as well as apartments and "annex" spaces in which to house students, and an overwhelming majority of students live on campus (98%). Each residence hall reserves a quarter of its rooms for housing first-year students with the exception of Pearsons Annex, which is reserved for living learning communities, and Dickinson House, which is reserved for Frances Perkins Scholars. Most residence halls house students from all four class years at any given time. In January 2018, Mount Holyoke opened a new centralized dining commons within the previously existing Blanchard Community Center. Previously, six dormitories on campus had dining areas inside of them, but the plan to consolidate these into one dining hall was made so that the college could shift to accept an unlimited meal plan and offer extended hours. Residence halls have a variety of architectural styles and ages.

Organization 
Mount Holyoke is a member of the Pioneer Valley's Five College Consortium, the Consortium of Liberal Arts Colleges, the Annapolis Group, the Oberlin Group, and the Consortium on Financing Higher Education.

WMHC (91.5 FM) is a radio station licensed to serve South Hadley, Massachusetts. The station is owned by Mount Holyoke College and is one of the oldest stations run by women.

Students 
In 2019, Mount Holyoke's 2,190 undergraduates included 1,021 White students, 587 international students, 183 Asian American students, 162 Latina students, 102 African American students, 2 Native American students, and 96 multiracial students.

Students may enroll in classes at Amherst, Hampshire, and Smith Colleges as well as the University of Massachusetts, Amherst through the Five College Consortium.

Student groups 
Mount Holyoke offers a number of student groups and organizations. Themes include Art, Academics, Club Sports, Entertainment & the Performing Arts, Politics & Activism, Governing Organizations and Religious organizations.

Among these student groups is the Mount Holyoke News, the college's independent, student-run organization which has been in print since 1917. Mount Holyoke News or MHN publishes on a weekly basis throughout the academic year with new issues going out in print form each Friday. A digital edition of each issue is also made available online each week through Issuu.

Traditions

Mount Holyoke Class Colors 
Mount Holyoke classes have been voting on class colors and mascots since the late 1800s, but the colors currently in use were not adopted until 1901. The class of 1901 chose hunter green, and the classes of 1902, ’03, ’04 voted for crimson, golden yellow, and royal blue, respectively. In 1909, the students voted for lion, griffin, sphinx, and pegasus as their class symbols. They also decided that even-year classes would use pegasus and lion and their colors would be red and blue, and odd years would use griffin and sphinx, with green and yellow as their colors. This system has persisted to this day.  Each class proudly displays their class color at class-related activities such as Convocation.

Events 
 The Kathryn Irene Glascock Awards grants The Glascock Prize to the winner of this annual event (which has been held at Mount Holyoke since 1924).
 The Faculty Show takes place once every four years, around 1 April; faculty members create a show which parodies themselves and their students.
 The Junior Show (also known as J-Show) refers to a show created by Juniors (and a few professors) who parody life at Mount Holyoke. A common feature is a sketch mocking the president and dean of the college, along with well-known professors.
 Mountain Day begins with the sound of ringing bells from Abbey Chapel on a beautiful autumn morning secretly chosen by the president of the college, all classes are canceled for the day and many students hike to the summit of nearby Mount Holyoke.
Holiday Vespers is an annual Christmas concert that has been held each year since 1899. In addition to the free performance held on campus in Abbey Chapel, each year the students perform in either Boston or New York City.
M&Cs, originally called Milk & Crackers, is now referred to as Milk & Cookies. M&Cs are a nightly snack provided by dormitory dining halls, but also refer to a student a cappella group, The M&Cs (Milk and Cookies).
Big/Little Sibling is a reference to the pairing of juniors and "firsties" (or first-years) who are paired up to take part in organized events together. Coordinated by the junior class board.
Pangy Day, originally called Pangynaskeia, has been a springtime tradition at Mount Holyoke for decades, but its origin is not totally clear. It's about celebrating spring after a long winter, and festivities including music, games, face-painting, ice cream, and more take place.
Elfing is a tradition shared between sophomores and first-years. Secret sophomore "elves" leave presents and treats for their first years throughout the week-long event. On the final day, the first-years get to meet their elves in person at a special M&Cs.
Founder's Day is held on the Sunday closest to 8 November (the date of the opening of Mount Holyoke in 1837). It was begun by Elizabeth Storrs Mead in 1891. The current version of the tradition includes ice cream being served early in the morning near Mary Lyon's grave. The current president of the college and select faculty are invited to scoop ice cream for the senior class who dons their gowns.
Convocation is a spirited celebration of community marking the beginning of the academic year. All students attend wearing their class colors, and seniors wear their graduation gowns to celebrate the start of their final year.
Canoe Sing is an event that takes place prior to commencement in which canoes are decorated with lanterns and paddled by seniors singing Mount Holyoke songs. They are joined by fellow graduating seniors on shore.
Baccalaureate is held in Abbey Chapel; the medieval German ode to Academe, "Gaudeamus Igitur" is sung by berobed Seniors and Faculty during the procession. Following convocation, Faculty line the path to Mary Lyon's grave. Seniors walk through this throng, to the grave (to place a wreath). The Baccalaureate Ceremony is a celebration that honors members of the graduating class. This traditional ceremony is for seniors only and holds a deep meaning: students are given a final charge and hear from their selected faculty and classmates. Academic regalia and a cap is worn.
The Laurel Parade takes place the day before commencement. Graduating seniors wear white and carry laurel garlands, in a parade to Mary Lyon's grave. They are escorted by approximately 3,000 alumnae, also in white, who thereby welcome them into the Alumnae Association. Once at Mary Lyon's grave, the garland is wound around the cast-iron fence, and the Mimi Fariña song "Bread and Roses" is sung by all in attendance. White is a tribute to those who fought for women's suffrage. In 1970 students voted to replace the laurel with signs protesting the Vietnam War.

Athletics 
Mount Holyoke offers 13 varsity sports programs and six competitive club sports teams. The college is a member of the National Collegiate Athletic Association (NCAA) Division III and the New England Women's and Men's Athletic Conference (NEWMAC) as well as the New England Rowing Conference (NERC). Facilities include a lighted synthetic multipurpose turf field surrounded by an eight-lane track with a nine-lane straightaway; Kendall Sports and Dance Complex housing a swimming pool and separate diving well; gymnasium with basketball, volleyball, and badminton courts; weight room; cardiovascular area;  field house with indoor track and tennis courts; squash courts; racquetball courts; and three studios for dance, aerobics, yoga, and other activities; The Orchards, an 18-hole golf course (home to the 2004 U.S. Women's Open) designed by Donald Ross; and a 60-stall equestrian center with two indoor arenas (100' × 256' and 70' × 130'), an outdoor show ring, permanent fibar dressage arena, outdoor cross-country courses, and a boathouse finished for Spring 2010.

Notable people

In popular culture

Literature 

 Wendy Wasserstein's 1977 play, Uncommon Women and Others, is based upon Wasserstein's experiences at Mount Holyoke of the early 1970s. The play explores the lives of the fictional characters Carter, Holly, Kate, Leilah, Rita, Muffet, Samantha, and Susie as they gather for lunch five years after graduation and reminisce about their collegiate days. The play was adapted into a television movie starring a then-unknown Meryl Streep.
 In Tayari Jones’s 2011 novel, Silver Sparrow, the two protagonists, Dana and Chaurisse, apply to Mount Holyoke College.

Film 
Several feature films reference Mount Holyoke. Prominent among them are:
Dirty Dancing (1987), which is set at a summer resort in the Catskills in the summer of 1963. The protagonist, Frances "Baby" Houseman (named after Mount Holyoke graduate Frances Perkins), plans to attend Mount Holyoke in the fall to study the economics of underdeveloped countries and then later to enter the Peace Corps. The film is screened annually for first-year students.
National Lampoon's Animal House (1978), which is set in 1962. It satirizes a common practice up until the mid-1970s when women attending Seven Sister colleges were connected with, or to, students at Ivy League schools. In the film, fraternity brothers from Delta house of the fictional Faber College (based on Dartmouth College) take a road trip to the fictional Emily Dickinson College (Mount Holyoke College).

Television 
An urban legend says that the characters of the hit 1960's cartoon Scooby Doo Where Are You! are said to be modeled after the Five College Consortium. Scooby Doo is meant to be University of Massachusetts Amherst, Shaggy is Hampshire, Fred is Amherst, Daphne is Mount Holyoke and Velma is Smith. These characterizations are made under the assumptions of stereotypes of the students from the Five Colleges.

Humor 
 A 1968 article in the Columbia University student newspaper Columbia Daily Spectator repeated a line from the 1964 movie Sex and the College Girl: "Smith to bed, Mount Holyoke to wed". This referred to the reputation of students from the two Seven Sisters Colleges. In the 1980s, Mount Holyoke students launched a campaign against a dating book and article written by two Princeton graduates that tell men how to pick up female students at women's colleges. Under the "Pickup Strategy" category, the article states: '"Low Key. Recall the Smith saying, 'Holyoke to bed; Smith to wed.''
 The Mount Holyoke song, "We're Saving Ourselves For Yale", alludes to the Ivy League-Seven Sisters relationship, which amusingly relates tales of women who hold onto their virginity long enough to catch a Yale graduate to marry. The song features prominently in Wendy Wasserstein's "Uncommon Women and Others."

References

Further reading 
 Harwarth, Irene B. "A Closer Look at Women's Colleges." National Institute on Postsecondary Education, Libraries, and Lifelong Learning, Office of Educational Research and Improvement, U.S. Department of Education, 1999.
 Harwarth, Irene B., Mindi Maline, and Elizabeth DeBra. "Women's Colleges in the United States: History, Issues, and Challenges: Executive Summary." U.S. Department of Education National Institute on Postsecondary Education, Libraries, and Lifelong Learning.
 Horowitz, Helen Lefkowitz. Alma Mater: Design and Experience in the Women's Colleges from Their Nineteenth-Century Beginnings to the 1930s, Amherst: University of Massachusetts Press, 1993 (2nd edition).

External links 

 
Liberal arts colleges in Massachusetts
Women's universities and colleges in the United States
Educational institutions established in 1837
Female seminaries in the United States
Seven Sister Colleges
Universities and colleges in Hampshire County, Massachusetts
1837 establishments in Massachusetts
South Hadley, Massachusetts
Private universities and colleges in Massachusetts